Kurt De Luis (born 18 February 1996) is a professional rugby league footballer who plays as a  for the North Sydney Bears in the NSW Cup.

He previously played for the Manly Warringah Sea Eagles in the NRL.

Background
De Luis played his junior football for the South Perth Lions in the Perth Rugby League before signing with the Townsville Stingers under 18s side.

Playing career
He then joined the Parramatta Eels under 20s and NSW Cup teams before linking up with the Blacktown Workers in 2019.
In round 14 of the 2021 NRL season, De Luis made his first grade debut for Manly-Warringah against North Queensland.
In November 2022, De Luis signed a contract to join Manly's arch-rivals North Sydney ahead of the 2023 season.

References

1996 births
Living people
Australian rugby league players
Manly Warringah Sea Eagles players
Rugby league props
Rugby league players from Perth, Western Australia